Mastixiodendron is a genus of flowering plants in the family Rubiaceae. It contains the following species (but this list may be incomplete):
 Mastixiodendron plectocarpum S.Darwin
 Mastixiodendron stoddardii Merr. & Perry

References

External links

 
Rubiaceae genera
Taxonomy articles created by Polbot